Herminia Albarrán Romero is a Mexican-American artist known for her papel picado (Mexican paper cutting) and altar-making. She received a National Heritage Fellowship from the National Endowment for the Arts in 2005, which is the United States' highest honor in the folk and traditional arts.

Early life 
Born and raised in Tlatlaya, Mexico, Albarrán Romero began learning her skills as a child from her mother. As a young woman she honed her craft with studies at Acatempa in Amatepel.

Artwork 

She has been commissioned to create works for several notable institutions, including the Oakland Museum of California, the California Palace of the Legion of Honor, and the Mission Cultural Center for Latino Arts. Romero currently resides in San Francisco, California.

Many of her exhibits focus on Dia de los Muertos celebrations, where she creates altars. She states of her work:

In creating my works for Dia de los Muertos, I am joyful as I senses the near presence of my loved ones. When I create papel picado and paper flowers, I again experience those childhood memories near my beloved mother and grandparents who also worked at these crafts. I feel connected to the love they have for me even in death and this is why I feel such a great joy within me.

Albarrán Romero collaborates as an altarista, or altar maker at Day of the Dead workshops across the United States.

Selected exhibits 

 Día de los Muertos Honor Altar at Mission Cultural Center for Latino Arts, San Francisco, CA, October–November 2005
 Día de los Muertos Altar at New College of California, San Francisco, CA, October–November 2005
 Día de los Muertos Altar at Palace of the Legion of Honor, San Francisco, CA, Fall 2004
 Virgen de Guadalupe Celebration at Mission Dolores Basilica: Papel picado and large paper roses, San Francisco, CA, December 2003
 Día de los Muertos Altar at Mission Dolores Basilica, San Francisco, CA, 2003
 Día de los Muertos Altar and Papel Picado Decorations for the Mission Cultural Center for Latino Arts, San Francisco, CA, 2003

References

External links
Mission Cultural Center for Latino Arts in San Francisco's Mission District

Mexican women artists
Paper artists
Women in craft
Year of birth missing (living people)
Living people
National Heritage Fellowship winners
Artists from the State of Mexico
Artists from San Francisco
American artists of Mexican descent
Mexican emigrants to the United States
20th-century American women artists
21st-century American women artists
Hispanic and Latino American artists